Dandy is a nickname which may refer to:

Johnny Dolan (1849 or 1850–1876), New York City murderer and reputed gang leader
Dandy Livingstone (born 1943), Jamaican reggae artist
Alfred Lowth (1817–1907), English cricketer
Jim "Dandy" Mangrum (born 1948), lead singer of the American Southern rock band Black Oak Arkansas
David Nicholls (racehorse trainer) (1956–2017), British jockey and racehorse trainer
George McLean (footballer, born 1943), Scottish former footballer
Johnny "Dandy" Rodríguez (born 1945), American bongo player
Dandy Sakano (born 1967), Japanese comedian

See also 

 
 
 Phillip Kastel (1893–1962), American gangster and gambler nicknamed "Dandy Phil"
 Don Meredith (1938–2010), American football quarterback, sports commentator and actor nicknamed "Dandy Don"
 17th Lancers, a British Army cavalry regiment nicknamed "Bingham's Dandies" which participated in the Charge of the Light Brigade

Lists of people by nickname